Klaus Kinski (1926–1991) was a German actor who appeared in more than 130 films.

Feature films

Television

Discography
 1962 Poetry of Friedrich von Schiller: Read in German by Kinski  (Folkways Records)
Kinski released nearly 25 spoken word records, some of which were re-released on CDs.
 2003 Kinski spricht Werke der Weltliteratur (Kinski Speaks Works of World Literature) a box-set of 20 CDs with Kinski's spoken word
 CD1. Kinski spricht Villon
 CD2. Kinski spricht Villon und Goethe
 CD3. Kinski spricht Rimbaud
 CD4. Kinski spricht Strindberg und Baudelaire
 CD5. Kinski spricht Schiller
 CD6. Kinski singt und spricht Brecht
 CD7. Kinski spricht Hauptmann und Nietzsche
 CD8. Kinski spricht Büchner und Majakowskij
 CD9. Kinski spricht Dostojewskij
 CD10. Kinski spricht Oscar Wilde I
 CD11. Kinski spricht Oscar Wilde II
 CD12. Kinski spricht Jack London und Stéphane Mallarmé
 CD13. Kinski spricht aus der Amerikaballade und der Dichtung afrikanischer Völker
 CD14+15. Kinski und Ensemble: Shakespeare I Hamlet
 CD16+17. Kinski und Ensemble: Shakespeare II: Romeo und Julia
 CD18+19. Kinski und Ensemble: Wiedersehen mit Brideshead
 Bonus-CD: Sechs Gramm Caratillo/Die Nacht allein

References

External links
Filmography by year from the Internet Movie Database
Filmography from Fandango.com
Filmography from Yahoo! Movies

Male actor filmographies
Director filmographies